LeRoy S. Zimmerman (born December 22, 1934) is a former Pennsylvania Attorney General.

In 2002, he was named to the PoliticsPA list of politically influential individuals. He was named again in 2003 and deemed a "power broker in Central Pennsylvania."  In 2010, Politics Magazine named him one of the most influential Republicans in the state.

Later career

After his term as Pennsylvania Attorney General, Zimmerman became the chairman of the Hershey Trust Company. He resigned at the end of 2011. In 2013, Kathleen Kane, the Pennsylvania Attorney General, announced the conclusion of a two-year investigation into the operations of the Hershey Trust Company, in which the Office of Attorney General and the Hershey Trust Company agreed that there was a finding of no wrongdoing, but reforms were required of the trust company.

References

External links
Profile at Eckert Seamans

Pennsylvania Attorneys General
Pennsylvania lawyers
Pennsylvania Republicans
Living people
1934 births